Sedina is a genus of moths of the family Noctuidae.

Sedina buettneri (Hering, 1858)

References
Natural History Museum Lepidoptera genus database
Sedina at funet

Hadeninae
Noctuoidea genera